Sidney Webber Northcote (1884-1952) was an actor and film director.

He was born in Liverpool, Lancashire in 1884. He married Kathleen Kerr in Manchester in 1921 and they had 3 sons. He died in London 1952 at the age of 67. He was the director 14 silent films made between 1912 and 1914. He also appeared as an actor in 7 short films shot on location in Wales and Cornwall that he directed in 1912 for the British and Colonial Kinematograph Company. All of them were scripted by Harold Brett and featured Dorothy Foster in the starring role. None is known to have survived.

1912
The Witch of the Welsh Mountains
A wounded window recovers in time to save the "wrong girl" from being burned at the stake (1)
The Smuggler's Daughter of Anglesea (sic)
The Belle of Bettwys-y Coed (sic)
The Pedlar of Penmaenmawr
The Fishergirl of Cornwall
A Cornish Romance
A Tragedy on the Cornish Coast
Through Death's Valley
Saved by Fire

1913
Adventures of Pimple

1914
The Troubles of an Heiress (Vera Northcote as 'The Kandy Kid')
The King of Crime
Detective Daring and the Thames Coiners
Mary the Fishergirl

1915
The Monkey's Paw
From a story by W.W. Jacobs, starring John Lawson as John White. White is shown a strange monkey's paw that will grant three wishes. He steals it from his friend, and learns that you must be careful what you wish for.

1927
In July 1927, Northcote appeared as Amiens and as Jacques in a production of Shakespeare's 'As You Like It' in Cardiff, Wales.

1932
In 1932 he produced what appears to have been his final film, 'Verdict of the Sea'.  
"A ship's captain plans on delivering some gems to their rightful owner; a gang of malcontents plots to grab the diamonds for themselves. Thanks to the help of a former doctor, the plot is foiled." (2)

References

Wales and the Cinema: The First Hundred Years.  David Berry.  University of Wales Press (1994) (1)
The Motion Picture Guide 1927 - 1983.  John Robert Nash & Stanley Ralph Ross. CineBooks Inc, Chicago  (1987) (2)
A Critical History of British Cinema. Roy Armes. Oxford University Press, New York, (1978)
Directors and Their Films  1895 - 1990. Brooks Bushnell. McFarland and Co. Jefferson NC & London (1993)
The Illustrated Who's Who in British Films. Dennis Gifford. Anchor Press, London (1978)
Matthew Sweet, 'The Guardian' 8 April 2011

English film directors
English male film actors
Male actors from Liverpool
1884 births
1952 deaths
20th-century English male actors